The holy figures of the Eastern Orthodox Church (and of the Eastern Catholic Churches of the Byzantine Rite) have various customary saint titles with which they are commemorated on the liturgical calendar and in Divine Services.

The following list explains the references:

Theologian: Has classical meaning, but only three saints are given the appellation Theologian: John the Theologian, Gregory the Theologian, and Symeon the New Theologian. 

Confessor: one who has suffered for the faith but not martyred outright
  Enlightener: the saint who first brought the faith to a people or region, or who did major work of evangelization there
Equal-to-the-Apostles: one whose work greatly built up the Church, whether through direct missionary work or through assisting the Church's place in society
Fool-for-Christ: a saint known for his apparent, yet holy insanity
God-bearing: title given to one of the Holy Fathers
Great-martyr: one who was martyred for the faith and suffered torture
Healer: a saint who used the power of God to heal maladies and injuries
Hieroconfessor: a confessor who is also a clergyman
Hieromartyr: a martyr who is also a clergyman
Martyr: one who has died for the faith
Merciful: one known for charitable work, especially toward the poor
Myrrhbearers: the first witnesses of the Resurrection of Jesus
Myroblyte, Myrrh-gushing or Myrrh-streaming: the relics of the saint exude holy and sweet-smelling (and often miraculous) oil
New-martyr: a martyr often bearing the same name as a more ancient martyr, but usually more recent in the Church's history
Passion-bearer: one who faced his death in a Christ-like manner
Prophet: an Old Testament saint who anticipated Christ
Protomartyr: the first martyr in a given region (in the case of Stephen the Protomartyr, the first martyr of the whole Church)
Right-Believing: an epithet used for sainted secular rulers
Righteous: a holy person under the Old Covenant (Old Testament Israel) but also sometimes used for married saints of the New Covenant (the Church)
Unmercenary Healer: a saint who used the power of God to heal maladies and injuries without charge
Venerable: a monastic saint
Venerable-martyr: a martyred monastic
Virgin Martyr: an unmarried, non-monastic, chaste female martyr
Wonder-worker: a saint renowned for performing miracles

See also
Honorifics
List of Eastern Orthodox saints

References

Sources
 Derived with permission from Saint titles at OrthodoxWiki.

 Titles
Titles
Saints
Types of saints
Saint titles